Charles McClung (May 13, 1761 – August 9, 1835) was an American pioneer, politician, and surveyor best known for drawing up the original plat of Knoxville, Tennessee, in 1791.  While Knoxville has since expanded to many times its original size, the city's downtown area still roughly follows McClung's 1791 grid.  McClung also helped draft Tennessee's constitution in 1796, surveyed and planned what is now Kingston Pike in 1792, and served as Knox County's first court clerk.  His home, Statesview, still stands in West Knoxville, and has been listed on the National Register of Historic Places.

Biography

Early life
McClung was born in Lancaster County, Pennsylvania, to Matthew McClung and Martha Cunningham McClung, both of Scots-Irish descent.  McClung later claimed that due to his mechanical aptitude, his father gave him an unfair amount of work on the family farm.  In 1778, McClung ran away to Philadelphia, where he found work as a clerk.  His employer was impressed with McClung's penmanship and record-keeping ability, and McClung gradually accumulated over $1,000 in savings.  He was fired, however, after he was caught flirting with his employer's daughter.

McClung subsequently returned home, and used his earnings to help his parents make improvements to the family farm.  In 1788, he departed again, heading southwestward through the Great Valley until he reached White's Fort (modern Knoxville) that same year.  In 1790, he married Margaret White (1771–1827), daughter of James White, the fort's builder.

Surveyor and politician

After the creation of the Southwest Territory in 1790, the territory's governor, William Blount, selected White's Fort as the territory's capital.  James White set aside land adjacent to the fort for a new town, named "Knoxville" after Secretary of War Henry Knox.  White employed McClung, who had acquired rudimentary knowledge of surveying while in Philadelphia, to draw up lots for the new town, which were sold at auction on October 3, 1791.

McClung's design consisted of a rectangular grid with the Tennessee River (then called the "Holston") as its southern boundary and First Creek as its eastern boundary.  The grid's original northern boundary was the road now known as Church Avenue, and its original western boundary was the road now known as Walnut Street.  This grid was divided into 64  lots.  Most of the early street names for the city (e.g., Front Street) were derived from street names in Philadelphia, where McClung had lived for several years.

In 1792, McClung surveyed and planned what is now Kingston Pike from Knoxville to Campbell's Station (Farragut).  The road was built to connect Knoxville with Fort Southwest Point, which was the eastern terminus of the Avery Trace. The road was originally thirty feet wide, and was many years later widened to fifty feet. During the same period, McClung was appointed Knox County's first court clerk, a position he held until 1834.  He was present at the Tennessee constitutional convention in 1796, and helped draft the state's initial constitution.  That same year, he was elected major in the state's Hamilton District militia.

Later life and legacy

McClung lived in the house until his death in 1835. In 1816, McClung and his eldest surviving son, Matthew, formed Charles McClung and Son, which operated a general store in Knoxville. In 1828, both Charles and Matthew McClung helped establish the Knoxville Female Academy, and donated land and money for the construction of the academy's school building.

McClung died while vacationing at Harrosdsburg Springs, Kentucky, in 1835, and was initially buried in a private cemetery in Harrodsburg.  In 1904, McClung's great-grandson, Lee McClung, had his remains reinterred in the family's plot in Knoxville's Old Gray Cemetery.

For over a century after his death, McClung's descendants continued to play prominent roles in the cultural and economic affairs of Knoxville.  Along with Lee McClung, who served as Treasurer of the United States in the early 1900s, McClung's descendants include railroad magnate Charles McClung McGhee and businessman Calvin Morgan McClung.  The Lawson McGhee Library, the Frank H. McClung Museum, and the Calvin M. McClung Historical Collection are among the institutions established by McClung's descendants.  McClung's Statesview home still stands in West Knoxville.  Another house once owned by McClung, the Alexander Bishop House, still stands in Powell, just north of Knoxville.

References

External links
Calvin M. McClung Historical Collection — Charles McClung — McClung's portrait

People from Knoxville, Tennessee
American surveyors
1761 births
1835 deaths
American people of Scotch-Irish descent